Ready Mixed Concrete (South East) Ltd v Minister of Pensions and National Insurance [1968] 2 QB 497 is a UK labour law case concerning the definition of a contract of service, rather than a contract for services. The distinction is important because many employment law rights under the Employment Rights Act 1996 require that a claimant has "employee" status under s 230. An employee is defined as someone with a contract of employment, and that is defined to be a contract of service (or apprenticeship).  This is a leading case.

A senior UK judge has stated that employment status is a matter of law.  This statement needs to be understood as clarifying that the parties to a contract do not have the clear power to define and agree (in a contract) that the contract is either employment, or not-employment.  This decision, where in dispute, is a matter for the courts.

Facts
Thomas Latimer had worked for Ready Mixed Concrete Ltd as a yard batcher from 1959 to 1963. The company delivered concrete, but had a policy of hiring independent contractor businesses to do the haulage because according to their policy documents, this allows

"speedy and efficient cartage, the maintenance of trucks in good condition, and the careful driving thereof, and would benefit the owner-driver by giving him an incentive to work for a higher return without abusing the vehicle in the way which often happens if an employee is given a bonus scheme related to the use of his employer's vehicle."

However they had become dissatisfied with their contractors and had started offering the jobs to current staff, with a set-up for hire-purchase for people to buy their own Leyland lorries (through a related company called "Ready Mixed Finance Ltd"). Latimer took up this chance. He went into the hire purchase to buy his own lorry, and was under a contract to haul concrete for the company. Latimer's contract described him as an "independent contractor" and he paid all the lorry running costs. But he had to put the company colours on his truck. He also had to wear a company uniform while he was working. He could only use the lorry for Ready Mixed purposes. His remuneration was calculated on mileage and load. The question about whether he was an "employee" or an independent contractor arose because the company was not paying national insurance contributions on his behalf under the National Insurance Act 1965. If he was self-employed they did not need to, but if he was an employee they did.

The Minister had found that Latimer was employed under a contract of service.  The case went to the High Court and MacKenna J disagreed, saying that Latimer was a 'small business man' so working under contract for services.

Judgment
McKenna J held that on the facts, Latimer was not an employee, but rather 'a small business man'. He considered case law from around the world on the matter, including Queensland Stations Pty Ltd v. Federal Commissioners of Taxation 70 C.L.R. 539, Montreal Locomotive Works Ltd v. Montreal and Attorney General of Canada [1947] 1 D.L.R. 161 and United States v. Silk 331 U.S. 704 US Ct. The most important part of the judgment is as follows.

See also
British labour law
Nethermere (St. Neots) Ltd. v. Gardiner And Another [1984] ICR 612

Notes

External links
Judgement in Ready Mixed Concrete (South East) Ltd v Minister of Pensions and National Insurance 
The judgment of a subsequent leading case O'Kelly v. Trust House Forte Plc [1984] QB 90

Labour relations in the United Kingdom
United Kingdom labour case law
High Court of Justice cases
1968 in case law
1968 in British law
1968 in labor relations